Justice By Any Means is an American documentary television program that premiered on TV One on December 7, 2015. Hosted by television show judge Faith Jenkins, the one-hour true crime reenactment program features various cases involving African Americans trying to "unravel mysterious crimes and find justice for a loved one." For the 2016 episodes, actor Malik Yoba replaced Faith Jenkins.

Episodes

References

External links 
 
 

2010s American documentary television series
2015 American television series debuts
English-language television shows
TV One (American TV channel) original programming
Television series featuring reenactments